Malfaxal (Malvaxal), also known as Na'ahai, is one of the many languages of the Malekula Coast group of Vanuatu.

References

External links 
 ELAR archive of Initial Documentation of Na'ahai
 Materials on Karnai are included in the open access Arthur Capell collection (AC2), and ASMPI collection held by Paradisec.

Malekula languages
Languages of Vanuatu